Gundwana v Steko Development and Others is an important case in South African property law, heard before the Constitutional Court on 10 February 2011.

Facts 
Elsie Gundwana bought a home through a loan provided by the bank, securing her debt by a mortgage bond on the property. When subsequently she fell into arrears, the bank obtained, by default judgement, an order declaring her property to be executable. The property was accordingly sold four years later. An order for eviction was sought against Ms Gundwana, and the matter ended up at the Constitutional Court.

Issue 
Gundwana sought orders that the registrar, acting under the Uniform Rules of Court, could not grant an order declaring a mortgaged home to be executable.

Judgment 
The court held that the registrar's order, under section 31(5) of the Uniform Rules of Court, declaring residential property to be executable, was unconstitutional, because judicial oversight is required where execution is sought against indigent debtors.

Consequences 
The Uniform Rules of Court now contains an amendment dealing with the consequences of this judgment:

(1)(a) No writ of execution against the immovable property of any judgment debtor shall issue until—
(i) a return shall have been made of any process which may have been issued against the movable property of the judgment debtor from which it appears that the said person has not sufficient movable property to satisfy the writ; or
(ii) such immovable property shall have been declared to be specially executable by the court or, in the case of a judgment granted in terms of rule 31(5), by the registrar: Provided that, where the property sought to be attached is the primary residence of the judgment debtor, no writ shall issue unless the court, having considered all the relevant circumstances, orders execution against such property.

See also 
 Jaftha v Schoeman
 South African property law
 Standard Bank v Saunderson

References 
 Gundwana v Steko Development and Others 2011 (3) SA 608 (CC). 2011 CCT 44/10 SAFLII.

Notes 

Constitutional Court of South Africa cases
2011 in South African law
2011 in case law
South African property case law